The 1994 OTB International Open was a combined men's and women's tennis tournament played on outdoor hard courts that was part of the World Series of the 1994 ATP Tour and WTA Tier III of the 1994 WTA Tour. It was the eighth edition of the tournament and was held in Schenectady, New York in the United States from August 22 through August 29, 1994. Jacco Eltingh and Judith Wiesner won the singles titles.

Finals

Men's singles

 Jacco Eltingh defeated  Chuck Adams 6–3, 6–4
 It was Eltingh's 1st singles title of the year and the 3rd of his career.

Women's singles
 Judith Wiesner defeated  Larisa Savchenko 7–5, 3–6, 6–4
 It was Wiesner's 1st singles title of the year and the 4th of her career.

Men's doubles

 Jan Apell /  Jonas Björkman defeated  Jacco Eltingh /  Paul Haarhuis 6–4, 7–6
 It was Apell's 3rd title of the year and the 4th of his career. It was Björkman's 3rd title of the year and the 3rd of his career.

Women's doubles
 Meredith McGrath /  Larisa Savchenko defeated  Pam Shriver /  Elizabeth Smylie 6–2, 6–2

References